The 1971 European Athletics Indoor Championships were held on 13 and 14 March 1971 in Sofia, the capital of Bulgaria.

The track used for the championships was 200 metres long.

Medal summary

Men

Women

Medal table

Participating nations

 (5)
 (6)
 (33)
 (15)
 (2)
 (13)
 (5)
 (17)
 (11)
 (6)
 (12)
 (2)
 (9)
 (9)
 (26)
 (18)
 (49)
 (12)
 (10)
 (5)
 (4)
 (42)
 (5)

References

 Results - men at GBR Athletics
 Results - women at GBR Athletics
 Detailed results at Die Leichtatletik-Statistik-Seite

External links
 EAA

 
European Athletics Indoor Championships
European Indoor Championships
European Athletics Indoor Championships
European Athletics Indoor Championships
International athletics competitions hosted by Bulgaria
Sports competitions in Sofia
1970s in Sofia
European Athletics Indoor Championships